Abraliopsis hoylei is a species of enoploteuthid cephalopod whose type locality is the Mascarene Islands, but this is uncertain, and the type specimen has been damaged, making taxonomic determination difficult.

References

Abraliopsis
Molluscs described in 1884